This is a list of the West Australian Football League premiers, the premier state-based Australian rules football league in Western Australia, and includes premiers of the Western Australian Football Association (1885–1906), Western Australian National Football League (1931–1979), WA State League (1990) and Westar Rules (1997–2000).

Premiers
In 1967, WAFL football historian Dave Clement discovered a discrepancy between the official premiership list as published by the league and what he had determined from examination of records from the time. The original list has Fremantle winning six of the first seven premierships; however, documentation was found that the Unions club had won three premierships in succession.  The discrepancy was not officially acknowledged and fixed until the League's centenary in 1985.

In the early years, a number of cups were awarded to clubs who won the premiership, including the "Dixson Cup" and the "Farley Cup".

On March 27, 1907, the WAFA was renamed the West Australian Football League (WAFL).

On Wednesday October 12, 1927, the WAFL was renamed the Western Australian National Football League (WANFL) – the "national" in the name being adopted by the SANFL, TANFL and other leagues when the Australian Football Council became the Australian National Football Council earlier in that year. 

Prior to 1931, premierships were either awarded to the team leading the ladder or who won a final. If the top team lost the final, then they had the right to call for a challenge match to be played the following week to determine the premiership. 

In 1931 the system changed to the Page finals system where the top two teams play in the second semi final, with the loser having a second chance and the winner progressing straight to the Grand Final. The winner of the third and fourth placed teams who played in the first semi final play the loser of the second semi final in the preliminary final.

Western Australian Football Association (1885–1906)

West Australian Football League (1907–1927)

Western Australian National Football League (1928–1979)

West Australian Football League (1980–1989)

W.A. State League (1990)

West Australian Football League (1991–1996)

Westar Rules (1997–2000)

West Australian Football League (2001–)

Records

Premierships

Current clubs

Defunct Clubs

Consecutive WAFL premierships

Minor grades

Reserves premierships

1925: Perth (1)
1926: East Fremantle (1)
1927: West Perth (1)
1928: Subiaco (1)
1929: Subiaco (2)
1930: West Perth (2)
1931: Subiaco (3)
1932: East Perth (1)
1933: East Perth (2)
1934: East Perth (3)
1935: East Perth (4)
1936: South Fremantle (1)
1937: Claremont (1)
1938: East Fremantle (2)
1939: East Fremantle (3)
1940: East Fremantle (4)
1941-45: not awarded (WW2)
1946: Swan Districts (1)
1947: West Perth (3)
1948: East Perth (5)
1949: Perth (2)
1950: East Fremantle (5)
1951: East Fremantle (6)
1952: South Fremantle (2)
1953: South Fremantle (3)
1954: South Fremantle (4)
1955: Perth (3)

1956: West Perth (4)
1957: Perth (4)
1958: Subiaco (4)
1959: Subiaco (5)
1960: West Perth (5)
1961: East Perth (6)
1962: East Fremantle (7)
1963: Perth (5)
1964: Swan Districts (2)
1965: East Perth (7)
1966: East Perth (8)
1967: East Perth (9)
1968: Perth (6)
1969: Subiaco (6)
1970: East Fremantle (8)
1971: Perth (7)
1972: Subiaco (7)
1973: Perth (8)
1974: Perth (9)
1975: Perth (10)
1976: East Perth (10)
1977: Claremont (2)
1978: East Perth (11)
1979: Swan Districts (3)
1980: Claremont (3)
1981: East Perth (12)
1982: Claremont (4)

1983: East Perth (13)
1984: Subiaco (8)
1985: South Fremantle (5)
1986: South Fremantle (6)
1987: Claremont (5)
1988: Perth (11)
1989: East Fremantle (9)
1990: Claremont (6)
1991: South Fremantle (7)
1992: South Fremantle (8)
1993: East Fremantle (10)
1994: East Fremantle (11)
1995: Subiaco (9)
1996: Perth (12)
1997: Subiaco (10)
1998: Subiaco (11)
1999: Subiaco (12)
2000: Claremont (7)
2001: East Fremantle (12)
2002: Subiaco (13)
2003: Subiaco (14)
2004: South Fremantle (9)
2005: Subiaco (15)
2006: Swan Districts (4)
2007: Subiaco (16)
2008: East Fremantle (13)
2009: South Fremantle (10) 

2010: Claremont (8)
2011: Claremont (9)
2012: Claremont (10)
2013: South Fremantle (11)
2014: West Perth (6)
2015: South Fremantle (12)
2016: Claremont (11)
2017: Subiaco (17)
2018: Subiaco (18)
2019: West Perth (7)
2020: East Perth (14)
2021: Perth (13)
2022: Subiaco (19)
Source where unlisted 
1921 East Fremantle
1922 West Perth
1923 Perth
1924 Perth

Colts (under-19) premierships

1957: Swan Districts (1)
1958: Swan Districts (2)
1959: Perth (1)
1960: Perth (2)
1961: Perth (3)
1962: East Fremantle (1)
1963: Perth (4)
1964: Perth (5)
1965: Perth (6)
1966: East Fremantle (2)
1967: East Perth (1)
1968: West Perth (1)
1969: East Fremantle (3)
1970: South Fremantle (1)
1971: Swan Districts (3)
1972: Perth (7)
1973: East Fremantle (4)
1974: Subiaco (1)
1975: East Perth (2)
1976: Claremont (1)
1977: Claremont (2)
1978: Claremont (3)
1979: Claremont (4)
1980: East Perth (3)

1981: East Fremantle (5)
1982: South Fremantle (2)
1983: South Fremantle (3)
1984: South Fremantle (4)
1985: South Fremantle (5)
1986: Claremont (5)
1987: East Fremantle (6)
1988: Claremont (6)
1989: Subiaco (2)
1990: West Perth (2)
1991: Swan Districts (4)
1992: East Fremantle (7)
1993: Claremont (7)
1994: Claremont (8)
1995: Claremont (9)
1996: Claremont (10)
1997: Claremont (11)
1998: East Fremantle (8)
1999: Perth (8)
2000: East Perth (4)
2001: East Fremantle (9)
2002: South Fremantle (6)
2003: South Fremantle (7)
2004: Peel Thunder (1)

2005: Peel Thunder (2)
2006: East Perth (5)
2007: Swan Districts (5)
2008: Swan Districts (6)
2009: Claremont (12) 
2010: East Fremantle (10)
2011: South Fremantle (8)
2012: South Fremantle (9)
2013: Claremont (13)
2014: Swan Districts (7)
2015: Claremont (14)
2016: Claremont (15)
2017: East Fremantle (11)
2018: Subiaco (3)
2019: Claremont (16)
2020: Subiaco (4)
2021: Swan Districts (8)
2022: Peel Thunder (3)
Source

Fourths premierships (1965–1974)

1965: East Perth (1) 
1966: Claremont (1)
1967: East Perth (2)
1968: Claremont (2)
1969: Swan Districts (1)

1970: Subiaco (1)
1971: Swan Districts (2)
1972: East Fremantle (1)
1973: Swan Districts (3)
1974: East Fremantle (2)
Source

See also
 List of WAFL Women's premiers

References

WAFL Premiers & Runners Up

West Australian Football League Premiers, List of

WAFL premiers